The Fondaco dei Tedeschi (Venetian: Fòntego dei Todeschi, in literal English, "warehouse of the Germans") is a historic building in Venice, northern Italy, situated on the Grand Canal near the Rialto Bridge. It was the headquarters and restricted living quarters of the city's German (Tedeschi) merchants.

Name 
The word fondaco comes from the Arabic funduq, which refers to an inn-like establishment for traveling merchants. Tedeschi means Germans.

History
First constructed in 1228, the building was rebuilt between 1505 and 1508, after its destruction in a fire. The reconstruction produced a very functional four-floor building which surrounds a grand inner courtyard. Its architecture is typical of the Italian Renaissance style. Like the Fondaco dei Turchi, the Fondaco dei Tedeschi combined the functions of a palace, warehouse, market and restricted living quarters for its population, in this case mainly Germanic merchants from cities such as Nuremberg, Judenburg and Augsburg.

The ground floor was accessible by water and was used for storage, while the first floor was dedicated to offices and an upper area contained about 160 living quarters. 

The German merchants arrived shortly after the building was originally constructed in the 13th century and stayed until the Napoleonic occupation. It was one of the city's most powerful colonies of merchants, and consequently the fondaco became an important trading centre for goods passing from the Orient on their way towards the Alps.  The Venetian Republic took commission on the transactions of the fondaco.

The German community worshipped at a nearby Catholic church, San Bartolomeo.

In the 20th century the building served as the Venice headquarters of the Poste Italiane. In 2008, the building was sold to the Benetton Group who asked the Dutch architect Rem Koolhaas to plan a new shopping centre to be incorporated into the Renaissance building. Benetton promised to transfer 6 million Euro to the city budget in exchange for building permits handed over by the end of 2012. This caused protests among the groups campaigning for preservation of the Italy's historical heritage. Today, the building houses a T Galleria duty-free store as part of the DFS Group.

Description
The fondaco (a word of Arabic origin meaning "store-house") has a square plan and has three levels facing a central courtyard. The courtyard contains a medieval well and is currently covered by a steel-glass structure. The façade has, at the lower floor, five large rounded arcades which enclose a portico where once the goods were unloaded from the Canal Grande. The second floor has a long row of double and single mullioned windows which, at the upper floors, are paired by smaller quadrangular windows. The top of the façade has merlons.

Around 1508, the façade on the Canal Grande was frescoed by Giorgione and Titian. Of that work, deteriorated by the salty and humid climate of the lagoon, a few fragments survive, now housed in the Ca'D'Oro of Venice.

The interior also features outstanding artworks by Paolo Veronese, Titian and Jacopo Tintoretto, also mostly disappeared.

See also
Venetian Ghetto
Fondaco dei Turchi
San Bartolomeo, Venice
Feast of the Rosary (Dürer)

References

Sources

External links
Restoration of the Fondaco

Houses completed in 1508
Renaissance architecture in Venice
Geography of Venice
Republic of Venice